The South China-Vietnam subtropical evergreen forests ecoregion (WWF ID: IM0149) covers the mountainous coastal region of southeastern China and northeastern Vietnam. The ecoregional also covers the coastal plain along the South China Sea and Hainan Island.  The area has significant biodiversity and ecological importance, with high levels of both endemic and threatened species.  Rapid urban expansion is reducing biologically-rich forests and wetlands.  Ecologically, the suptropical forests are at the northeastern extent of the Indomalayan realm.

Location and description 
The ecoregion stretches from the northeastern corner of Vietnam, across the lower half of southeastern China, and down into coastal Hainan Island.  To the north is the watershed of the Pearl River, to the south is the South China Sea.  The terrain is mountainous for the most part, except along the coasts and around the Leizhou Peninsula.  The ecoregion runs across the southern half of Guangxi and Guangdong Provinces, with the major Guangzhou/Shenzhen/Hong Kong urban area in its east.

Climate 
The climate of the ecoregion is Dry-winter humid subtropical climate (Köppen climate classification (Cwa)). Precipitation in the wet summer months is ten time or more the average of the winter months. The ecoregion is mostly below 23d 30m latitude, and below the frost line.

Flora and fauna 
Tropical genera represent 80% of the flora of the ecoregion.  The forests of the area are under pressure from the increase in rubber and pulp plantations, and commercial agricultural crops in the understory.  As of 2012, the region supported 117 threatened species (out of a total of 1,114 species), 28 of which were endemic.

See also 
 List of ecoregions in China

References 

Ecoregions of China
Ecoregions of Vietnam
Indomalayan ecoregions
Tropical and subtropical moist broadleaf forests